The Pergaminho Sharrer ("Sharrer Parchment") is a mediaeval parchment fragment containing seven songs by King Denis of Portugal, with lyrics in the Galician-Portuguese language and musical notation.

The fragment was discovered in 1990 by American scholar Harvey L. Sharrer, of University of California, Santa Barbara. Sharrer was analysing documents in the Torre do Tombo archive in Lisbon, when he found the folio in the binding of a 16th-century book. Before Sharrer's discovery, the only known Galician-Portuguese mediaeval manuscript with love (non-religious) songs and musical notation was the Vindel Parchment, which contains seven songs by troubadour Martim Codax. Several songbooks covering the period exist, but all of them lack musical notation except the Cantigas de Santa Maria, which are religious in tone.

The text and musical notation of the Sharrer Parchment are fragmentary, due to damage  done to the folio during the centuries; but further damage was inflicted during a disastrous "restoration" by Portuguese authorities. The parchment is written with Gothic letters and contains seven love songs (cantigas de amor). Even though the name of the author is not given, all songs appear in the same order in other songbooks (cancioneiros) of Galician-Portuguese poetry (Cancioneiro da Biblioteca Nacional and the Cancioneiro da Vaticana), where they are attributed to King Dinis I of Portugal (reigned 1279-1325), known for his love for the arts. The folio probably belonged to a larger 14th century songbook that has been lost.

The songs of the Sharrer Parchment are:
Poys que vos Deus, amigo, quer guisar
A tal estado me adusse, senhor
O que vos nunca cuidei a dizer
Que mui grão prazer que eu hei, senhor
Senhor fremosa, no posso eu osmar
Não sei como me salva a minha senhor
Quis bem amigos, e quero e querrei

Since their discovery, the songs have been recorded by several groups dedicated to early music like the Theatre of Voices.

See also
Pergaminho Vindel
Cancioneiro da Biblioteca Nacional
Cancioneiro da Ajuda
Cancioneiro da Vaticana
Cantiga de amigo
Cantigas de Santa Maria
Portuguese literature
Troubadour

References
Harvey L. Sharrer. The discovery of seven cantigas d'amor by Dom Dinis with musical notation. Hispania 74, May 1991.
Manuel Pedro Ferreira. Cantus Coronatus: 7 Cantigas d’El Rei Dom Dinis. Kassel: Reichenberger, 2005.
 Visualization

Portuguese music history
Galician language
Portuguese literature
Galician-Portuguese
Chansonniers (books)